An extensive list of the freshwater fish found in California, including both native and introduced species.

References

California
.California